Back for Good is the seventh studio album by German duo Modern Talking, released on 30 March 1998 by Hansa Records, following the reunion of the duo. The album includes new versions of 11 previous singles, four new songs, two remixes and a medley. Back for Good debuted atop the German Albums Chart on 13 April 1998 and spent a total of five weeks at the top. It was eventually certified five-times gold by the Bundesverband Musikindustrie (BVMI), denoting shipments in excess of 1.25 million units in Germany. The album was also successful outside of Germany, topping the charts in Austria, Finland, Norway, Sweden and Switzerland.

Music style
The reunion of Thomas Anders and Dieter Bohlen as Modern Talking resulted in a different sound compared to their original 1980s sound. The duo came back recording their materials based on the demand of the central European markets. The singles including "You're My Heart, You're My Soul '98" consisted of up-tempo beats as well as raps performed by Eric Singleton. Most of Modern Talking's materials could no longer be viewed as Europop, instead they were pure electronic music numbers with an exception of some of the tracks on Back for Good including the re-packaged versions of "Lady Lai" and "Give Me Peace on Earth" and the new ballads "I Will Follow You" and "Don't Play with My Heart".

Reception
AllMusic gave the album four stars out of five.

Track listing

Personnel
 Dieter Bohlen – production
 Luis Rodríguez – co-production
 Amadeus Crotti – arrangements 
 Lato Titenkov – arrangements 
 Eric Singleton – vocals 
 Manfred Esser – photos
 Ronald Reinsberg – cover design, art direction

Charts

Weekly charts

Year-end charts

Certifications

See also
 List of best-selling albums in Germany

References

1998 albums
Hansa Records albums
Modern Talking albums